Troy Simon (born 20 July 1980) is an Antiguan and Barbudan footballer, currently playing for Freemansville F.C. in the Antigua and Barbuda Premier Division.

Club career
Simon has attended the University of South Carolina Upstate and has played for Freemansville during the winter seasons in the USA.

International career
Nicknamed Bucket, Simon made his debut for Antigua and Barbuda in an April 2000 FIFA World Cup qualification match against Bermuda and has earned nearly 20 caps since. He played in 7 FIFA World Cup qualification games.

National team statistics

References

External links
 
 

1980 births
Living people
Antigua and Barbuda footballers
Antigua and Barbuda international footballers
Association football defenders
Expatriate soccer players in the United States
USC Upstate Spartans men's soccer players